{{Infobox legislature
| name              = Ramagundam Municipal Corporation
| legislature       =
| coa_pic           = 
| coa_res           = 250px
| coa_alt           =
| logo              =
|political_groups1 = 
Government (33)
 TRS (27)
 IND (6)
Opposition (11)
 INC (11)
Others (6)
 BJP (6)
| house_type        = Municipal Corporation
| body              = Ramagundam
| houses            = 
| leader1_type      = Mayor
| leader1           = Bangi Anil Kumar 
| party1            = TRS
| leader2_type      = Deputy Mayor
| leader2           = Nadipelli Abhishek Rao 
| party2             = TRS
| leader3_type       = Municipal Commissioner
| leader3            = P. Uday Kumar
|established_title   = Creation
|established_date    = 25 Feb 2010
|established_title2  = Corporation Act
|established_date2   = 2010
| last_election1     = January 27, 2020
|seats               = 50
| session_room     = 
| session_res      = 250px
| meeting_place      = 
| website            = 
| motto = 
| structure1 =  Ramagundam Municipal Corporation 2020.svg
| structure1_res = 300px             
}}

The Ramagundam Municipal Corporation''' is the local governing body, administering the city of Ramagundam, Peddapalli district in the Indian state of Telangana. 

The municipal corporation consists of democratically elected members, is headed by a mayor and administers the city's governance, infrastructure and administration.
This city is selected under central government scheme of AMRUT.

References

Karimnagar
Municipal corporations in Telangana
Local government in Telangana
Year of establishment missing